Kwabena Appiah-Kubi (born 1992) is a New Zealand-born professional footballer who plays as a winger for Indonesian club Madura United. Appiah also holds Australian citizenship.

Biography
Born in Auckland of Ghanaian parents, Appiah arrived in Sydney, Australia, as a six-year-old. He started playing football in the Granville Association, and came of age in the Western Sydney region at Parramatta City, Granville Rage and Spirit FC. He lived in Parramatta, and was educated at Parramatta Marist Brothers. Having never made a competitive international appearance, Appiah remains eligible for New Zealand, Australia and Ghana

Club career

Central Coast Mariners
Appiah was a part of the 2011–2012 Central Coast Mariners, A-League National Youth League winning squad in which he scored 9 goals throughout the season.

Western Sydney Wanderers
On 25 June 2012, Appiah joined Western Sydney Wanderers as one of the club's first three signed players.
On 6 October he made his A-League debut against his former youth club, Central Coast Mariners, in the Wanderers' first ever competitive match.

Appiah won the A-League Minor Premiership and the Asian Champions League at his time at the club along with winning the VISY Wanderers Asian Champions League player of the year award.

On 31 January 2015, Appiah left Western Sydney Wanderers, with the players contract terminated by mutual consent.

Wellington Phoenix
On 13 February 2015 he joined Wellington Phoenix on an 18-month contract.

Return to Central Coast Mariners
At the end of his contract, Appiah was released by the Phoenix, and subsequently returned to Central Coast Mariners on trial. After a successful trial, Central Coast Mariners signed him on a one-year deal. Appiah scored his first ever A-League goal against Adelaide United on 5 February, lobbing the opposition goalkeeper. On 29 May 2017, Appiah signed a one-year contract extension with Central Coast Mariners.

Incheon United
On 31 January 2018, Appiah left the A-League to move to Korean club Incheon United. He made his debut for Incheon on the opening day of the K League 1 season against Gangwon in March. He scored his first goal for the club against Pohang Steelers in August. On 16 January 2019, Appiah left Incheon United after nearly a year with the K League 1 side.

A-League career statistics

Honours

Club
Central Coast Mariners
 National Youth League: 2011–12

Western Sydney Wanderers
 A-League Premiership: 2012–13
 AFC Champions League: 2014

References

External links
 Western Sydney Wanderers player profile
 

1992 births
Living people
Soccer players from Sydney
Association footballers from Auckland
New Zealand association footballers
Australian people of Ghanaian descent
New Zealand emigrants to Australia
Association football forwards
Northern Spirit FC players
Western Sydney Wanderers FC players
Wellington Phoenix FC players
Central Coast Mariners FC players
Incheon United FC players
Newcastle Jets FC players
Western United FC players
Kwabena Appiah
Madura United F.C. players
A-League Men players
K League 1 players
Kwabena Appiah
Liga 1 (Indonesia) players
New Zealand Football Championship players
Expatriate footballers in South Korea
Expatriate footballers in Thailand
Expatriate footballers in Indonesia
Australian expatriate sportspeople in South Korea
Australian expatriate sportspeople in Thailand
Australian expatriate sportspeople in Indonesia